Andriy Viktorovych Yudin (born 28 June 1967) is a Ukrainian professional football coach and a former player.

Playing career
He made his professional debut in the Soviet First League in 1985 for FC Kuban Krasnodar.

Honours
 Soviet Top League runner-up: 1989.
 Soviet Cup winner: 1989.
 USSR Federation Cup winner: 1989.
 USSR Federation Cup runner-up: 1990.
 Ukrainian Premier League runner-up: 1993.
 Ukrainian Premier League bronze: 1992, 1995, 1996.

European club competitions
 European Cup 1989–90 with FC Dnipro Dnipropetrovsk: 6 games, 1 goal.
 UEFA Cup 1990–91 with FC Dnipro Dnipropetrovsk: 2 games.
 UEFA Cup 1994–95 with FC Tekstilshchik Kamyshin: 3 games.

References

1967 births
Living people
Soviet footballers
Ukrainian footballers
Ukrainian expatriate footballers
Ukraine international footballers
Soviet Top League players
Ukrainian Premier League players
Russian Premier League players
FC Kuban Krasnodar players
FC SKA Rostov-on-Don players
FC Dnipro players
FC Torpedo Zaporizhzhia players
FC Tekstilshchik Kamyshin players
FC Fakel Voronezh players
FC Kryvbas Kryvyi Rih players
Ukrainian football managers
FC Krymteplytsia Molodizhne managers
Expatriate footballers in Russia
FC Urozhay Krasnodar managers
Association football midfielders
Association football defenders